The 1931 Colgate football team was an American football team that represented Colgate University as an independent during the 1931 college football season. In its third season under head coach Andrew Kerr, the team compiled an 8–1 record, shut out five of nine opponents, and outscored all opponents by a total of 227 to 34. John Orsi was the team captain. The team played its home games on Whitnall Field in Hamilton, New York.

Schedule

References

Colgate
Colgate Raiders football seasons
Colgate football